Tiago Fernandes may refer to:

 Tiago Fernandes (Portuguese footballer) (born 1981), Portuguese football manager and former midfielder
 Tiago Fernandes (Brazilian footballer) (born 1990), Brazilian football midfielder
 Tiago Fernandes (tennis) (born 1993), Brazilian tennis player